Septoria bataticola is a fungal plant pathogen infecting sweet potatoes.

References

External links 
 Index Fungorum
 USDA ARS Fungal Database

bataticola
Fungal plant pathogens and diseases
Root vegetable diseases
Fungi described in 1914